North Escobares is a census-designated place (CDP) in Starr County, Texas, United States. The population was 118 at the 2010 census down from 1,692 at the 2000 census.

Geography
North Escobares is located at  (26.432492, -98.971935).

Prior to the 2010 census, part of North Escobares CDP was incorporated into Escobares city, parts were taken to form new CDPs and additional area was lost. As a result, the CDP's total area was reduced to 0.7 square mile (1.8 km), all land.

Demographics
At the 2000 census there were 1,692 people, 412 households, and 390 families in the CDP. The population density was 638.3 people per square mile (246.5/km). There were 505 housing units at an average density of 190.5/sq mi (73.6/km).  The racial makeup of the CDP was 99.47% White, 0.06% African American, 0.12% from other races, and 0.35% from two or more races. Hispanic or Latino of any race were 94.44%.

Of the 412 households 72.8% had children under the age of 18 living with them, 68.4% were married couples living together, 23.5% had a female householder with no husband present, and 5.3% were non-families. 4.9% of households were one person and 1.5% were one person aged 65 or older. The average household size was 4.11 and the average family size was 4.26.

The age distribution was 46.6% under the age of 18, 9.9% from 18 to 24, 28.8% from 25 to 44, 10.7% from 45 to 64, and 4.0% 65 or older. The median age was 20 years. For every 100 females, there were 88.6 males. For every 100 females age 18 and over, there were 82.4 males.

The median household income was $15,958 and the median family income  was $16,750. Males had a median income of $16,071 versus $6,250 for females. The per capita income for the CDP was $4,562. About 59.7% of families and 61.4% of the population were below the poverty line, including 67.1% of those under age 18 and 15.8% of those age 65 or over.

Education
Public education in the community of North Escobares is provided by the Roma Independent School District. The zoned elementary school is Veterans Memorial Elementary School. Roma High School is the district's sole comprehensive high school.

Zoned campuses in the 2009-2010 school year included Anna S. Canavan Elementary School (pre-kindergarten), either Ynes B. Elementary School or Emma Vera Elementary School (grades K-5), Ramiro Barrera Middle School (grades 6-8), and Roma High School  (grades 9-12).

References

Census-designated places in Starr County, Texas
Census-designated places in Texas